Fr. Kevin Mackin, O.F.M. (born 1937 or 1938) is an academic administrator and Roman Catholic priest.

On July 1, 2008, he became president of Mount Saint Mary College, a private, independent, coeducational, four-year liberal arts college, located in Newburgh, New York. Mackin's inauguration as president took place on October 17, 2008. He replaced former president Sr. Anne Sakac, O.P., who had been president since 1976.

Mackin was formerly president of Siena College, a liberal arts college in Loudonville, New York. In April 2010 Seton Hall University announced that he is one of two finalists for the Office of President of the University.

References

External links
Mount Saint Mary College - President's Office
Seton Hall University

Heads of universities and colleges in the United States
American Roman Catholic priests
Living people
1930s births
American Friars Minor
Siena College people